Ludolf Grisebach was a German film editor. He worked on over thirty films between 1933 and 1966.

Selected filmography
 The Tsarevich (1933)
 Mother and Child (1934)
 The Sporck Battalion (1934)
 Trouble Backstairs (1935)
 Suburban Cabaret (1935)
 White Slaves (1937)
 The Citadel of Warsaw (1937)
 Pedro Will Hang (1941)
 The Big Game (1942)
 Anuschka (1942)
 The Endless Road (1943)
 I Need You (1944)
 Night of the Twelve (1949)
 Operation Edelweiss (1954)
 Circus of Love (1954)
 Escape to the Dolomites (1955)

References

Bibliography 
 Rentschler, Eric. The Films of G.W. Pabst: An Extraterritorial Cinema. Rutgers University Press, 1990.

External links 
 

Year of birth unknown
Year of death unknown
German film editors